WSQV (92.1 FM is a radio station licensed to Lock Haven, Pennsylvania and serving the central Pennsylvania area.) Using the tagline: "The Valley’s Best Rock," WSQV serves Clinton, Centre, and Lycoming counties with a classic rock format.  The radio station is designed for the specific wants and needs of central Pennsylvania.  Locally owned and independently operated by Schlesinger Communications, Inc.  Daily programming on WSQV includes rock music, news, sports, weather, public service and more.

External links
WSQV official website

SQV
Radio stations established in 1983
1983 establishments in Pennsylvania